The 2025 Virginia Attorney General election will be held on November 4, 2025, to elect the next attorney general of Virginia. Incumbent Republican Attorney General Jason Miyares is eligible to run for re-election.

Republican convention

Candidates

Potential
Jason Miyares, incumbent Attorney General (2022–present)

Democratic primary

Candidates

Potential 
 Steve Descano, Fairfax County Commonwealth's Attorney (2020–present)
 Jay Jones, former state delegate for the 89th district (2018–2021) and candidate for attorney general in 2021
 Shannon Taylor, Henrico County Commonwealth's Attorney (2012–present)

References 

Attorney General
2025
Virginia